The House of Cornaro or Corner were a family in Venice who were patricians in the Republic of Venice and included many Doges and other high officials. The name Corner, originally from the Venetian dialect, was adopted in the eighteenth century. The older standard Italian Cornaro is no longer common in Italian sources referring to earlier members of the family, but remains so in English.

History

The family and name Cornaro are said to descend from the gens Cornelia, a patrician family of Ancient Rome. The Cornari were among the twelve tribunal families of the Republic of Venice and provided founding members of the Great Council in 1172. In the 14th century, the family separated into two distinct branches, Cornaro of the Great House and Cornaro Piscopia. The latter name derived from the 1363 grant of the fief of Piscopia in the Kingdom of Cyprus to Federico Cornaro.  

When Caterina Cornaro married king James II of Cyprus in 1468, the Lusignan royal arms were added to the family arms party per pale. They had eight palaces on the Grand Canal, Venice at different times, including Ca' Corner and what is now the Palazzo Loredan dell'Ambasciatore. They commissioned many famous monuments and works of art, including Bernini's Ecstasy of St Theresa in the Cornaro Chapel of Santa Maria della Vittoria, Rome (1652). In Greece the islands of Scarpanto and Kasos were their fiefs from the early 14th century until the Ottoman conquest.

Sugar trade 
The Cornaro Piscopias ran a large sugar plantation in their fief near Episcopi in Venetian Cyprus, in which they exploited slaves of Syrian or Arab origin or local serfs. Sugar was transformed in-house with a large copper boiler made in Venice that the family paid hefty sums to maintain and operate. They exported sugarloafs and powdered sugar to Europe. The Cornaros were often in conflict with their neighbors over the use and handling of water.

Members
 Felicia Cornaro (died 1111), dogaressa of Venice
 Andrea Cornaro (died 1323), Margrave of Bodonitsa
 Marco Cornaro (c.1286–1368), doge 1365–68
 Federico Cornaro (died 1382), merchant and politician, founder of the Piscopia plantation
 Pietro Cornaro (died in 1387 or 1388), Lord of Argos and Nauplia from 1377
 Marco Cornaro (1406–1479), trader, patrician, diplomat
 Luigi Cornaro (c.1464–1566), who wrote treatises on dieting
 Giorgio Cornaro (1452–1527), brother of Caterina Cornaro
 Caterina Cornaro (1454–1510), Queen of Cyprus from 1474 to 1489
 Francesco Cornaro (1476–1543), Cardinal from 1527
 Marco Cornaro (1482–1524), cardinal from 1522
 Andrea Cornaro (cardinal) (1511–1551), Italian Roman Catholic bishop of Brescia, and later cardinal
 Giorgio Cornaro (1524–1578), Italian Roman Catholic Bishop of Treviso 
 Federico Cornaro (1531–1590), Italian Roman Catholic Cardinal-Priest of Santo Stefano al Monte Celio
 Luigi Cornaro (cardinal), Italian Roman Catholic cardinal and Archbishop of Zadar
 Andrea Cornaro (historian) (1547–c.1616), Venetian aristocrat, historian and author
 Vitsentzos Kornaros (1553–1614), Cretan poet
 Marco Cornaro (1557–1625), Italian Roman Catholic prelate who served as Bishop of Padua 
 Cardinal Federico Baldissera Bartolomeo Cornaro (1579–1653), Patriarch of Venice 1631–44
 Giovanni I Cornaro (1551–1629), doge from 1624
 Marco Antonio Cornaro (1583–1639), Italian Roman Catholic Bishop of Padua
 Francesco Corner (1585–1656), doge in 1656
 Elena Cornaro Piscopia (1646–1684), first woman to get a Doctor of Philosophy degree (from the University of Padua in 1678)
 Giovanni II Cornaro (1647–1722), doge from 1709  
 Giorgio Cornaro (cardinal) (1658–1722), cardinal from 1697
 Laura Cornaro (d.1739), dogaressa of Venice, by marriage to the Doge Giovanni II Cornaro 
 Giovanni Cornaro (1720–1789), cardinal from 1778

References

External links
Cornaro family

Republic of Venice families
Italian noble families